Sebranice is a municipality and village in Svitavy District in the Pardubice Region of the Czech Republic. It has about 1,000 inhabitants.

Administrative parts
The hamlet of Vysoký Les is an administrative part of Sebranice.

Geography
It lies in the Svitavy Uplands. The village lies in the valley of the Jalový Stream.

History
The first written mention of Sebranice is from 1347. The municipality was created by merger of villages of Sebranice, Pohora and Kaliště and hamlets of Vysoký Les and Třemošná in 1950.

Sights
The landmark of Sebranice is the Church of Saint Nicholas. It was originally a late Gothic church from the second half of the 13th century, baroque rebuilt in the late 17th and early 18th centuries. The tower was added in 1768.

Twin towns – sister cities

Sebranice is twinned with:
 Zlatá Baňa, Slovakia

Gallery

References

External links

Villages in Svitavy District